The Canada Men's Under-19 National Floorball Team is the men's under-19 national floorball team of Canada, and a member of the International Floorball Federation. The team is composed of the best floorball players in Canada under the age of 19. Canada's under-19 men's team is currently ranked 13th in the world at floorball, and plays in the B-Division at the World Floorball Championships.

The Canada National Team is organized by Floorball Canada. The team made its international floorball debut against Germany on May 6, 2009, in Raisio, Finland. The match was part of the 2009 Men's under-19 World Floorball Championships, and ended with a 5:5 draw.

World Championship Roster

Players
As of May 17, 2019

Team Staff

 General Manager - Josh McGillivary 
 Head coach - Matthew Smith 
 Head coach - Tyler Brush 
 Assistant coach - Christopher Woodford 
 Trainer - Justin MacLellan 
 Athletic therapist - Patrick Welsh

Rankings & Records

World rankings

All-Time World Championship Records

Head-to-head International Records

References

External links

Canadian floorball teams
Floorball
Sports clubs established in 2009
2009 establishments in Canada
Men's national floorball teams